The 2006 Dubai World Cup was a horse race held at Nad Al Sheba Racecourse on Saturday 25 March 2006. It was the 11th running of the Dubai World Cup.

The winner was Godolphin's American-bred Electrocutionist, a five-year-old bay horse trained in the Dubai by Saeed bin Suroor and ridden by Frankie Dettori. Electrocutionist's victory was the third in the race for Dettori, the fifth in the race for bin Suroor and the fourth for Godolphin.

Originally trained in Italy, Electroctionist won the Gran Premio di Milano and the International Stakes before being sold to Godolphin and transferred to the stable of Saeed bin Suroor. On his debut for his new connections he raced for the first time on dirt and won the third round of the Al Maktoum Challenge. In the 2006 Dubai World Cup he started the 5/4 favourite and won by one and a half lengths from the American-trained Brass Hat, with Wilko three lengths back in third. The Japanese-trained second favourite Kane Hekili finished fifth of the eleven runners. The runner-up Brass Hat was subsequently disqualified after failing a post-race dope test.

Race details
 Sponsor: Emirates Airline
 Purse: £3,488,372; First prize: £2,093,023
 Surface: Dirt
 Going: Fast
 Distance: 10 furlongs
 Number of runners: 11
 Winner's time: 2:01.32

Full result

 Abbreviations: DSQ = disqualified; nse = nose; nk = neck; shd = head; hd = head; nk = neck

Winner's details
Further details of the winner, Electrocutionist
 Sex: Stallion
 Foaled: 24 February 2001
 Country: United States
 Sire: Red Ransom; Dam: Elbaaha (Arazi)
 Owner: Godolphin
 Breeder: Compagnia Generale

References

Dubai World Cup
Dubai World Cup
Dubai World Cup
Dubai World Cup